Orko may refer to:
 Orko (character), a fictional character from the Masters of the Universe franchise
 Orko (deity), a thunder god in some Iberian mythologies
 Orko Eloheim, an American hip hop artist
 Risto Orko, a Finnish film director
 Urqu Jawira (Aroma), a river in Bolivia also known as Orko Jahuira

See also 
 Chawpi Urqu (disambiguation), several mountains also spelled "Chaupi Orko"
 Orco (disambiguation)